Free Lips is a 1928 silent film mystery drama directed by actor Wallace MacDonald. It stars June Marlowe.

A copy is preserved in the Library of Congress collection.

Cast
June Marlowe - Ann Baldridge
Frank Hagney - Bill Dugan
Jane Novak - Flossie Moore
Ernest Shields - The Fox
Olin Francis - Det. Kelly
Edna Hearn - Mazie

References

External links
 Free Lips at IMDb.com

1928 films
American silent feature films
American black-and-white films
American mystery drama films
1920s mystery drama films
1928 drama films
1920s American films
Silent American drama films
Silent mystery drama films